The Ottawa Curling Club is an historic curling club located on O'Connor Street in the Centretown neighbourhood of Ottawa, Ontario, Canada. It is the oldest curling club in Ottawa, established in 1851 by Allan Gilmour as the Bytown Curling Club. The Club first played on the Rideau Canal until 1858. It subsequently moved to different locations around the city until finally settling at its current location on O'Connor in 1916. In 1931 the club was expanded to the current capacity of 5 curling sheets. Artificial ice was also installed at that time.

The club is home to 2017 World Champion and 2018 and 2022 Olympian Rachel Homan, and is the former home of 1998 and 1999 Junior Men's World Curling Champion and 2018 and 2022 Olympian John Morris. The Ottawa Curling Club is one of two clubs in Downtown Ottawa, the other is the Rideau Curling Club, which maintains a rivalry with the Ottawa.

History

The By Town Curling Club was established in 1851 under the presidency of lumber businessman Allan Gilmour. Its earliest facility was a rudimentary shed located near Lisgar Street adjoining the Rideau Canal. Canal water was used to construct the single ice sheet. The club constructed a new rink on Albert Street east of O'Connor in 1867, expanding play to two sheets. In 1878, the club spent $510 to move the building structure to a property near Wellington Street west of Kent on the former Vittoria Street which is today federal property in the Supreme Court district. The rink structure was replaced by a brick building which opened in December 1906. In 1914, the club lost the land due to a significant federal government expropriation.

The club's present location was opened in December 1916 when premises on O'Connor Street were provided through a gift by James Manuel, a wealthy local businessman, curler and club president. In 1927, the club was threatened with eviction by Toronto General Trusts which represented Manuel's estate at that time. The club maintained that the terms of agreement with Manuel that it had rightful control of the property as long as the facilities were maintained for curling. In the following year, the courts ruled that the club had no formal claim to the property due to the club's unincorporated status at that time, combined with the lack of a written will or agreement regarding Manuel's wishes. The club therefore was required to purchase the property from the estate.

Formal incorporation of the Ottawa Curling Club Limited was completed in 1929. Artificial ice and expansion from four to five sheets followed in 1931.

Presidents
 1851-1895: Col. Allan Gilmour
 1895-1914: John Manuel
 1914-1917: James Manuel
 1918-1921: William Manuel
 1922-1936: George F. Henderson, KC
 1936-1942: Hugh Carson
 1942-1950: Darcy Finn
 1950-1952: Olin Beach
 1952-1955: W.E. Hodgins
 1955-1958: Ted Moffat
 1958-1961: B. Brocklesby
 1961-1963: Howard Grills
 1964-1966: Alan Brown
 1966-1968: Gordie Perry
 1968-1970: Harold Scrim
 1970-1972: Bill Davis
 1972-1974: E. Macdonald
 1974-1976: Don MacKinnon
 1976-1978: Dick Rich
 1978-1980: Dave Smith
 1980-1982: Stan Grover
 1982-1984: Ted Root
 1984-1986: Pat Craig
 1986-1988: Bob York
 1988-1990: Rod Matheson
 1990-1992: Sandra Chisholm
 1992-1994: Brad Shinn
 1994-1996: Steve Mitchell
 1996-1998: Eric Johannsen
 1998-2000: Barbara Brown
 2000-2002: Terry Clark
 2002-2004: Gord Perry
 2004-2006: Gayle Greene
 2006-2008: Gord Critch
 2008-2012: Geoff Colley
 2012-2014: Michael Loewen
 2014-2016: Tom Sinclair
 2016–2018: Matthew Kellett
 2018–2020: Eddie Chow
 2020–2022: Michael Burke
 2022–present: Nicole Merriman

Leagues
The Ottawa Curling Club has a number of different curling leagues that participate at the club. Some are club leagues, while others (like the teachers league or the Rainbow Rockers Curling League) are rentals. Official leagues at the club are the Monday Ladder (open), Business Women (Tuesday), Getting Started/Learn to Curl (Tuesday), Open Cash (Wednesday), Business Men (Thursday), Mixed (Friday), Saturday Men, Sunday Open, Daytime League, Little rocks/bantam and the University/College League.

Cash League
The cash league which runs Wednesday evenings is the league with the highest calibre of curling. Some of the top curlers in the world curl in the cash league at the Ottawa Curling Club. Winners of games receive money, which can vary depending on the level the teams involved are at. The league is open, so there are both men's and women's teams. Curlers in the OCC Cash league include Lauren Mann, Lynn Kreviazuk, Cheryl Kreviazuk, David Mathers, Lee Merklinger, Erin Morrissey, Karen Trines, Kira Brunton, Jean-Michel Ménard, Jenn Hanna, Lisa Weagle and Pascale Letendre.

University / College League
For the 2006–07 season, the Ottawa Curling Club introduced a league on Sunday nights for students in the Ottawa area to participate. At the time, no university in the city had a curling team, so this league was created to facilitate interest in curling from students in Ottawa. At the end of the year, the first championship was played between Carleton University and the University of Ottawa with Carleton winning 6–4.

Club Champions
The club championship is held annually. It is a playoff round featuring the top teams from each of the leagues at the club.

Current famous curlers
Jenn Hanna - 2005 Scott Tournament of Hearts runner-up
Earle Morris - 1985 Ontario men's champion (represented the R.C.N. Curling Club); 1982 Quebec champion; 1980 Manitoba champion, invented the Stabilizer curling broom, coach of the Australian curling team skipped by Hugh Millikin)
Jean-Michel Ménard - 2006 Brier Champion and World Championships runner-up
Eldon Coombe, 1972 provincial champion
Craig Savill - 2007 Brier and World Champion lead for Glenn Howard
Rachel Homan - Four time provincial bantam champion; 2006 Canada Games gold medalist; 2010 Canadian Junior champion; 2013, 2014 and 2017 Scotties Tournament of Hearts champion; 2017 World Champion
Andrew Mikkelsen - 1996 Canadian Junior Champion
Gilles Allaire - 2004 Northern Ontario Mixed Champion
Chris Gardner  - former provincial bantam and junior mixed champion
Stephanie Hanna - 2005 Scott Tournament of Hearts runner-up (with sister Jenn)
Matt Paul - 2005 Canada Cup of Curling participant
Michael Raby - former World Deaf Curling Champion
Neil Sinclair - 2007 Canada Games silver medalist
Robyn Mattie - 2003 Canadian Junior Runner-up
Emma Miskew - Four time provincial bantam champion; 2006 Canada Games gold medalist; 2010 Canadian Junior Champion; 2013, 2014 and 2017 Scotties Tournament of Hearts champion; 2017 World Champion (third for Rachel Homan)
Alison Kreviazuk, 2013 and 2014 Scotties Tournament of Hearts champion (second for Rachel Homan)
Lisa Weagle, 2013, 2014 and 2017 Scotties Tournament of Hearts champion; 2017 World Champion (lead for Rachel Homan)

Source: 2006-07 Ottawa Curling Club Directory. See also Hall of Fame

Famous past members
Sir Sanford Fleming, inventor of standard time
Alexander Mackenzie, former Prime Minister of Canada
John Morris & Brent Laing, 1998 & 1999 World Junior Champions
Brad Gushue - Alternate for John Morris at the 1998 World Junior Championships (Member in name only)
Melanie Robillard - curled with Jenn Hanna in 2000 and as part of the German National Team with Andrea Schöpp won the 2008 European Mixed Championships Kitzbühel, Austria, won the 2009 Women European Championships Aberdeen, Scotland, participated with the German National Team that finished 6th in the Women Curling event at the Olympics in Vancouver and was part of the German Women National Curling Team that won the Women World Curling Championships Swift Current, Saskatchewan, Canada
Markku Uusipaavalniemi - skip of the 2006 Olympic silver medalist Finnish team
Hugh Millikin - skip of the Australian national team
Roy Ananny - Canadian Football League player
Ian Palangio - Australian curler.

Events
The Ottawa and Rideau Curling Clubs used to host the John Shea Insurance Canada Cup Qualifier. In 2003, both clubs hosted the 2003 Canadian Junior Curling Championships. The club also hosted the 2006 and 2007 Canadian Blind Curling Championships.

Provincial champions

Notes

References

External links
Website
Rainbow Rockers Curling League

Curling clubs established in 1851
Curling clubs in Canada
Sports venues in Ottawa
Curling in Ottawa
1851 establishments in Ontario